Sanmina Corporation is an American electronics manufacturing services (EMS) provider headquartered in San Jose, California that serves original equipment manufacturers in communications and computer hardware fields. The firm has nearly 80 manufacturing sites, and is one of the world’s largest independent manufacturers of printed circuit boards and backplanes. , it is ranked number 482  in the Fortune 500 list.

History

Sanmina was founded by Jure Sola and Milan Mandarić in 1980 as a printed circuit board manufacturer. It was named after Milan Manadarić's daughters Sandra and Jasmina. During the 1980s, it expanded into manufacturing backplanes and subassemblies  for the telecommunications industry. During the 1990s, the company grew, producing complete products for major OEM companies and completing a number of acquisitions. Jure Sola became CEO and Chairman of Sanmina in 1991. The company completed an initial public offering on NASDAQ in 1993.

Merger and name changes
In December 2001, Sanmina merged with SCI Systems of Huntsville, Alabama, for $6 billion in cash, stock, and debt. Although Sanmina was only half as large as SCI at the time, it was in a better cash position because its core telecommunications business was performing well, whereas SCI's lower-margin businesses such as personal computer manufacturing, were struggling.  Shortly after, Sanmina-SCI bought E-M Solutions, a bankrupt Fremont, California electronics manufacturer, for $110 million in cash. Then in early 2002, Sanmina acquired Rancho Santa Margarita-based Viking Interworks for $15 million ($10.9 million in cash and 390,000 shares of Sanmina stock worth $10.26 per share at the time).

On November 15, 2012, the company changed its name to Sanmina.

On July 2, 2015, the company announced that it had acquired the CertainSource Technology Group.

Change of Leadership
Bob Eulau replaced co-founder Jure Sola becoming the CEO effective October 2, 2017. After this change, Sola assumed the role of Executive Chairman of the Board .  Hartmut Liebel assumed the role of CEO in October, 2019. Jure Sola returned again as CEO in August 2020.

Operations
In 2015, the San Jose, California-based company had 38,417 employees in over 27 countries on six continents.  It serves clients in the fields of communications, computing, multimedia, semiconductors, defense, aerospace, medical applications, and automotive technology.  It provides  consulting, design, engineering, logistics, new product introduction, assembly, machining, and fabrication, to produce printed circuit boards, backplanes, electrical cables, injection-molded plastics, enclosures and frames, optics.

On May 11, 2018, Ather Energy, announced it had entered into an agreement with the company to develop and manufacture key components for its maiden scooter and production would take place in the company's facility in Chennai, India.

On March 3, 2021, Astrotech Corporation announced that its Astrotech Technologies, Inc. subsidiary has entered into an agreement with Sanmina Corporation to manufacture its mass spectrometry products. As part of the relationship, Sanmina will manufacture 1st Detect’s TRACER 1000. They have also agreed to manufacture AgLAB’s AgLAB-1000 and BreathTech’s BreathTest-1000 once those products are officially released.

References

External links

 

Manufacturing companies based in San Jose, California
Electronics companies established in 1980
Electronics manufacturing
Companies listed on the Nasdaq
Electronics companies of the United States
1980 establishments in California
1993 initial public offerings